Beinn Bheoil (1,019 m) is a mountain in the Grampian Mountains of Scotland, located on the western shore of Loch Ericht in Highland.

Taking the form of a ridge, the peak is usually climbed in conjunction with its neighbour Ben Alder. The nearest village is Dalwhinnie in the northeast.

References

Mountains and hills of Highland (council area)
Marilyns of Scotland
Munros
One-thousanders of Scotland